Abdallah Gomaa Awad (born February 26, 1993) is an Egyptian professional footballer who currently plays as a right-back for the Egyptian club Enppi. In 2014, he joined Al-Nasr in a free transfer from Enppi, two years later, Enppi signed him by a 3-year contract from Al-Masry.

References

External links
 
 

1993 births
Living people
ENPPI SC players
Al Masry SC players
Al Nasr SC (Egypt) players
Egyptian footballers
Association football defenders
Egyptian Premier League players